Liu Bei (161 – 10 June 223), courtesy name Xuande, was a Chinese warlord in the late Eastern Han dynasty who later became the founding emperor of Shu Han, one of the Three Kingdoms of China. Although he was a distant relative of the Han imperial family, Liu Bei's father died when he was a child and left his family impoverished. To help his mother, he sold shoes and straw mats. When he reached the age of fifteen, his mother sent him to study under Lu Zhi. In his youth, Liu Bei was known as ambitious and charismatic. He gathered a militia army to fight the Yellow Turbans. Liu Bei fought bravely in many battles and grew famous for his exploits. Later, he participated in the coalition against Dong Zhuo, following this joined his childhood friend Gongsun Zan and fought under him against Yuan Shao.

Later he was sent to help Tao Qian against Cao Cao. Thanks to the support of the influential Mi and Chen families along with Tao Qian's last will, Liu Bei inherited the Xu Province. After his defeat against Cao Cao, Lü Bu joined him.  However, Lü Bu took advantage of Liu Bei being away fighting Yuan Shu and seized Xu Province. Later Liu Bei joined Cao Cao and they defeated Lü Bu at the Battle of Xiapi. Although he was treated well by Cao Cao, Liu Bei received a secret edict from the emperor to kill Cao Cao. So, he rebelled against Cao Cao taking back Xu province. After a brief alliance with Yuan Shao, Liu Bei was quickly defeated by Cao Cao and had to join Yuan Shao. He was sent by Yuan Shao to create uprisings behind Cao Cao's main base, and later joined his kinsman Liu Biao. Although, Liu Biao treated him well, he doubted Liu Bei's loyalty, so he sent him to Xinye to serve as a shield against Cao Cao. According to the Wei Shu (魏書) and Records of Heroes. Like Tao Qian, Liu Biao desired to have Liu Bei inherit his province over his sons however Liu Bei refused. After Liu Biao's death, Liu Bei and his supporters joined Liu Qi in Xiakou where they allied with Sun Quan. Together they opposed Cao Cao at the Battle of Red Cliffs.

After Cao Cao's defeat, Liu Bei quickly took control of the majority of Jing Province. He then married Sun Quan's sister. Sun Quan then recognised the legitimacy of Liu Bei's control of the Jing Province and agreed to "lend" him Nan Commandery. Liu Bei later led his army to join another kinsman, Liu Zhang, in his war against the warlord Zhang Lu. Based on the advice of his advisors, Liu Bei betrayed Liu Zhang and seized the Yi Province from him. After engaging in a series of conflicts with Sun Quan and seeing Cao Cao's coming closer to the Yi province, Liu Bei agreed to yield half of the Jing province to Sun Quan and led his army against Xiahou Yuan at Hanzhong and seized it. Liu Bei then declared himself "King of Hanzhong" and set up his headquarters in Chengdu. However soon after his senior general Guan Yu was killed by Liu Bei's "ally" Sun Quan who took the rest of Jing province. Liu Bei was furious and after declaring himself emperor to challenge Cao Pi's authority, he led his army against his former ally. Though some early success, his army was soon forced into a stalemate against Sun Quan general Lu Xun and was subsequently defeated. Ashamed by his failure, he never returned to Chengdu and settled in Baidicheng where he lived until his death one year later. Urged his heir, Liu Shan not to emulate him and rather be as virtuous as possible. Before he died Liu Bei appointed Zhuge Liang to advise his son on domestic matters with Li Yan to advise him on the military matters.

Despite early failings and lacking both the material resources and social status his rivals commanded, he gathered support among disheartened Han loyalists who opposed Cao Cao, the warlord who controlled the Han central government and the figurehead Emperor Xian and led a popular movement to restore the Han dynasty. Liu Bei overcame a number of setbacks to carve out his own realm, which at its peak spanned present-day Sichuan, Chongqing, Guizhou, Hunan, and parts of Hubei and Gansu.

Culturally, due to the popularity of the 14th-century historical novel Romance of the Three Kingdoms, Liu Bei is widely regarded as the ideal benevolent and humane ruler who cared for his people and selected good advisers for his government. His fictional counterpart in the novel was a salutary example of a ruler who adhered to the Confucian set of moral values, such as loyalty and compassion. Historically, Liu Bei, like many Han rulers, was greatly influenced by Laozi. He was a brilliant politician and leader whose skill was a remarkable demonstration of "Confucian in appearance but Legalist in substance".

Historical sources
The authoritative historical source on Liu Bei's life is the Records of the Three Kingdoms (Sanguozhi) written by Chen Shou in the third century. During the fifth century, Pei Songzhi annotated the Sanguozhi by incorporating information from other sources to Chen Shou's original work and adding his personal comments. In 2006, William Gordon Crowell translated his complete biography found into the volume 32 of Chen Shou's Sanguozhi and made it freely available via Academia.edu.

Physical appearance
The historical text Records of the Three Kingdoms described Liu Bei as a man seven chi and five cun tall (approximately 1.74 metres), with long arms that "extended beyond his knees" and ears so large that "he could see them". Liu Bei has been called "Big Ears" (大耳) by both Lu Bu and Cao Cao.

Family background

According to the third-century historical text Records of the Three Kingdoms, Liu Bei was born in Zhuo County, Zhuo Commandery (present-day Zhuozhou, Hebei). He was a descendant of Liu Sheng, who was the ninth son of Emperor Jing and the first King of Zhongshan in Han dynasty. However, Pei Songzhi's fifth-century commentary, based on the Dianlue, said that Liu Bei was a descendant of the Marquis of Linyi. As the title "Marquis of Linyi" was held by Liu Fu (劉復; a great-nephew of Emperor Guangwu) and later by Liu Fu's son Liu Taotu, who were descendants of Liu Fa (劉發), King Ding of Changsha – another son of Emperor Jing, it was possible that Liu Bei descended from this line rather than Liu Sheng's line.

Liu Bei's grandfather Liu Xiong and father Liu Hong both served in provincial and commandery offices. Liu Bei's grandfather, Liu Xiong did well and was recommended as a candidate for civil office in the xiaolian process. Then, he rose to become prefect of Fan (范) in Dong Commandery.

Early life (161–184) 

However Liu Bei's father, Liu Hong didn't live long and Liu Bei grew up in a poor family. Having lost his father when he was still a child. Moreover, even if Liu Bei's claim to royal lineage was genuine, he did not derive much wealth from his royal ancestors since Han law decrees that each generation of royals must divide their inheritance among all male children and Liu Bei's generation was too far removed from his illustrious ancestors'. As such, Liu Bei was not considered different from normal people. To support themselves, Liu Bei and his mother sold shoes and straw-woven mats. Despite this, Liu Bei was full of ambition from childhood. In the southeast of his house, there was a mulberry tree that was very tall (11,5 meters high). When looked from far away, the tree's shade was similar to a small cart therefore people from all around the village felt that this tree was unique with some saying that the house would produce a person of nobility. A fortune teller named Li Ding (李定) of Zhuo stated: "This family will certainly produce an estimable man." When he was a kid, Liu Bei would play beneath the tree with other children from the village. He would often say: "I must ride in this feather covered chariot (emperor chariot)." Liu Bei's uncle Zijing (子敬) thought of Liu Bei's dream as foolish and that he would bring destruction to his house.

In 175, when he was 14, his mother sent him to study with Lu Zhi, a distinguished man and former grand administrator of Jiujiang Commandery. Lu Zhi was from Zhuo Commandery, the same as Liu Bei. One of his fellow-students was Gongsun Zan of Liaodong, with whom he became friends. Since Gongsun Zan was older, Liu Bei treated him as an elder brother. Another fellow-student was his kinsman Liu Deran. Liu Deran's father, Yuanqi (元起), often gave Liu Bei material support to help him and his mother and treated him the same as his son, Liu Deran. Yuanqi's wife wasn't happy about this and told him: “Each has his own family. How can you regularly do this?” Yuanqi answered: “This boy is in our clan, and he is an extraordinary person.”

The adolescent Liu Bei was said to be unenthusiastic in studying. However he was fond of dogs and horses; he also displayed interest in hunting, music and dressing in fine clothing. He enjoyed associating with braves (haoxia), and in his youth he fought and hung out with them. He would not manifest his anger or happiness and always showed a pleasant face in front of others. Liu Bei was charismatic and all the heroic youth bonded with him.

Around this time, Two great horse merchants from Zhongshan. Zhang Shiping and Su Shuang, were very wealthy and had riches of several thousands in gold. They sold horses and when they passed through Zhuo commandery. They met Liu Bei and were struck by his appearance and personality. So they gifted him much money and wealth. Thanks to their assistance, Liu Bei was able to assemble a large group of followers.

Yellow Turban Rebellion (184–189) 
In 184, at the end of the reign of Emperor Ling, the Yellow Turbans rose up and started the Yellow Turban Rebellion. Every province and commandery would call for righteous man to defend the country. Liu Bei saw what was happening and became much more politically aware. He called for the assembly of a militia to help government forces suppress the rebellion. And rallied a group of loyal followers, including among them Guan Yu, Zhang Fei and Jian Yong.

Liu Bei led his militia to join the local government forces led by Colonel Zou Jing and participated in battles against the rebels with distinction. Around this time, Liu Ziping of Pingyuan heard of Liu Bei's reputation as a brave man. And when Zhang Chun (張純) rebelled, the Qing Province was ordered by imperial decree to send an attendant official to lead an army to defeat Zhang Chun. As they passed through Pingyuan, Ziping recommended Liu Bei to the attendant official. Liu Bei accepted and joined him. When they met the rebels in the landscape. Liu Bei was gravely wounded and had to fake death. After the rebels left, a friend of him loaded him into a cart and carried him away. Thus, he was able to escape. In recognition of his contributions, the Han central government appointed Liu Bei as the Prefect of Anxi County (安喜縣; northwest of present-day Anguo, Hebei), one of the counties in Zhongshan Commandery.

Later, the Han central government decreed that any official who had gained the post as a reward for military contributions was to be dismissed and an inspector was sent to Liu Bei's prefecture. Liu Bei doubted that he would be among those to be dismissed. Therefore, when he saw the inspector and recognized him; he wanted to meet him however the inspector refused to see him and claimed illness. Liu Bei was furious, he returned to his office, led clerks and soldiers to the postal relay station. And forced his enter through the door; he said: "I have been secretly instructed by the Commandery Administrator to arrest the inspector!" Thereupon he tied the inspector and led him to the outskirts of the district then he bound him to a tree, undid his ribbon of office and tied it to the inspector's neck; and gave him more than one hundred strokes with a bamboo stave. Liu Bei wanted kill him however the inspector begged him for mercy and so he didn't. After this incident, he left his office.

He then travelled south with his followers to join another militia. Around this time, the General-in-Chief He Jin sent the Chief Commandant Guanqiu Yi (毌丘毅) to Danyang with the mission to recruit soldiers and Liu Bei joined him in fighting the Yellow Turbans remnants in Xu Province. When they reached Xiapi, they met the rebel army and Liu Bei fought hard with talent. As a reward for his contributions, the Han central government appointed him as the Prefect and Commandant of Gaotang County.

Warlord state

In Gongsun Zan's service (189–194) 

Liu Bei visited the capital during the last years of Emperor Ling of Han, later along with Cao Cao, they returned to the State of Pei and gathered many people. When Emperor Ling died, the land fell into chaos and Liu Bei raised an army and joined the Campaign against Dong Zhuo. Later, when he returned to Gaotang County; the commandery was overwhelmed by rebels and he opted to move north to join an old friend, the warlord Gongsun Zan. In 191, they scored a major victory against another warlord Yuan Shao (leader of the former alliance against Dong Zhuo) in their struggle for control of Ji Province and Qing Province. Gongsun Zan nominated Liu Bei to be the Chancellor of Pingyuan State and sent him to join his subordinate Tian Kai in fighting Yuan Shao's eldest son Yuan Tan in Qing Province. In defending against the governor of Ji province, Yuan Shao he fought many battles with distinction. Therefore, he was appointed probationary prefect of Pingyuan and later was made the concurrent chancellor of Pingyuan.

While he was in Pingyuan, a resident named Liu Ping (劉平) had since long held Liu Bei in low esteem so was ashamed of having to serve under him. Liu Ping hired an assassin to kill Liu Bei. However, Liu Bei didn't realize his intention and treated him generously, so much so that the assassin could not bring himself to kill him and informed Liu Bei before he left. Such was the extent to which Liu Bei had won the hearts of the people. Pingyuan was poor so people were starving and they banded together to commit robbery. Liu Bei externally guarded against bandits and internally he generously carried out economic measures. He would make persons who ranked beneath the elite sit on the same mat and eat from the same pot. He felt no cause to be picky so people attached themselves to him in droves.

During his tenure at Pingyuan, Kong Rong worked as the Chancellor of Beihai State (北海國) and was besieged by an army led by Yellow Turbans. He sent Taishi Ci to ask for reinforcement from Liu Bei. When he learned of this, Liu Bei said: "So, Kong Wenju knows that there is a Liu Bei in this world?" Thereafter, he sent troops to rescue Kong Rong and the siege was lifted.

Succeeding Tao Qian (194) 

In 194, Yuan Shao's ally Cao Cao attacked Tao Qian, the Governor of Xu Province. At the time, there were two opposing alliances with Yuan Shu, Tao Qian and Gongsun Zan on one side against Yuan Shao, Cao Cao and Liu Biao on the other. In face of strong pressure from Cao Cao, Tao Qian appealed to Tian Kai for help. Tian Kai and Liu Bei led their armies to support Tao Qian. Liu Bei himself led over 5 000 soldiers with mixed barbarian cavalry from the Wuhuan of You province. He also conscripted several thousands among the people.

Despite initial success in the invasion, Cao Cao's subordinate Zhang Miao rebelled and allowed Lü Bu to take over Cao Cao's base in Yan Province forcing Cao Cao to retreat from Xu Province. Tao Qian asked Liu Bei to station his army in nearby Xiaopei and gave him 4 000 more troops from Danyang in addition to the thousand's troops and Wuhuan cavalry already under his command. Thus, Liu Bei broke with his supervisor Tian Kai for Tao Qian. Tao Qian became Liu Bei's mentor and Liu Bei benefited greatly under the tutelage of Tao Qian who governed like a Confucian populist which influenced Liu Bei's future governance. Then, Tao Qian memorialized the court to have Liu Bei appointed as the inspector of Yu province. Liu Bei led his army to Xiaopei, then proceeded to raise troops around the area, and actively built-up connections with influential clans and people of the region. In a rather short period of time, he had gained the support of the two most powerful families in Xu Province: the Mi family led by Mi Zhu and Mi Fang and the Chen family led by Chen Gui and Chen Deng.

The previously mentioned Chen Deng was a man of great talent and enjoyed giving appraisal of well known people. He once said to the scholar Chen Jiao (陳矯) about Liu Bei: "When It comes to those of bold character that are destined to be heroes, those who lay great plan to become hegemon-kings, I respect Liu Bei." Then he grouped him along with Chen Ji (Chen Shi's son), Hua Xin and Kong Rong as outstanding individuals.

Soon Tao Qian's illness became serious and he told to the mounted escort Mi Zhu: "Other than Liu Bei, there is no one who can bring peace to this province." Upon Tao Qian's death in 194, the Mi family backed Liu Bei instead of one of Tao Qian's sons to be the new Governor of Xu Province. Mi Zhu then led the residents of the province to meet Liu Bei however he was still hesitant and apprehensive about taking this post. He then consulted Kong Rong and Chen Deng.

Chen Deng told him: "Today the House of Han is in decline and the empire is in chaos. It is the moment to establish merit and to accomplish affairs. This province is rich with a population of one million. We wish to impose on you the post of the inspector and have you assume charge of the affairs of the province." Liu Bei answered: "Yuan Shu is nearby at Shouchun. That man is from a line of four dukes in five generations. The empire is turning to him. You can give the province to him.” Chen Deng then said: "Gonglu (Yuan Shu's courtesy name) is arrogant. He is not the ruler to bring order out of the chaos. Now, I wish to assemble 100 000 infantry and cavalry for my lord. Above, you can assist our sovereign and bring aid to the common people then you could fulfill the calling of the Five Hegemons. Below you could allocate territory and preserve the boundaries. Finally, you could write your achievements on bamboo and silk to be recorded for the posterity. If the inspector does not assent then I also dare not to obey the inspector."

The chancellor of Beihai, Kong Rong also told him: "Is Yuan Gonglu someone who will be concerned about the state and forget his family? In what way are dried bones in the grave worthy of our attention? As far as today's matter is concerned, the people will adhere to men of talent and ability. If one does not accept what heaven offers to him then it will be too late if you regret, it later.” Both of them advised him to form an alliance with Yuan Shao.

At that time, Chen Deng with Mi Zhu along with the others sent a messenger to call on to Yuan Shao saying: "Heaven has sent down disastrous stench and misfortune has fallen upon our humble and small region. Recently, Tao Qian has died and the people are without a ruler. They fear that greedy rapace will one day take advantage of the opening to extend themselves therefore are very anxious. However, they will embrace the former Administrator of Pingyuan Liu Bei as their rightful leader. Hence allowing the people to know that they have someone to rely on. Just now rebel are around all the regions; there's not a moment of peace to remove his armor. Hence we respectfully send lower officials to report this to the officials in charge." Yuan Shao answered: "Liu Xuande is liberal and refined. He is also known as a man of trust and righteousness. Now, (the people of) Xu region happily accepts him; this matches my own desires." Liu Bei finally took over Xu Province after Yuan Shao recognised the legitimacy of his governorship.

Conflict with Lü Bu (195–198) 

In 195, Lü Bu was defeated by Cao Cao and sought shelter under Liu Bei. In the next year, Yuan Shu led an army to invade Xu Province. In response, Liu Bei led his troops to counter Yuan Shu's advances near present-day Xuyi County and stopped him at Xuyi and Huaiyin (淮陰). Around this time, Cao Cao memorialized to appoint Liu Bei as General Who Subdues The East and enfeoffed him as marquis of Yicheng Village. This was in the first year of the Jian'an period (196).

Liu Bei and Yuan Shu had a standoff for about a month without any decisive result. In the meantime, Zhang Fei whom Liu Bei left in charge of Xiapi Commandery (下邳郡; around present-day Pizhou, Jiangsu), the capital of Xu Province, murdered Cao Bao, the Chancellor of Xiapi after an intense quarrel. Cao Bao's death stirred up unrest in Xiapi Commandery which provided the warlord Lü Bu an opportunity to link up with defectors from Liu Bei's side to seize control of Xiapi Commandery and capture Liu Bei's family.

Upon receiving news of Lü Bu's intrusion, Liu Bei immediately headed back to Xiapi Commandery but most of his troops scattered along the way. With his remaining men, Liu Bei moved eastward to take Guangling Commandery where Yuan Shu's forces defeated him. Liu Bei then retreated to Haixi County (海西縣; southeast of present-day Guannan County, Jiangsu).

However, surrounded by hostile forces and facing a lack of food supplies, Liu Bei and his men resorted to cannibalism. Pressed by poverty and hunger, Liu Bei's men wanted to return to Xiapi. Liu Bei eventually had no choice but to send an official request to surrender to Lü Bu who accepted his surrender and ordered Liu Bei to return to the seat of Xu and to combine their strength to defeat Yuan Shu. He then prepared the regional inspector's chariot and returned his family to the bank of the Si River as an act of good faith. Before Liu Bei left, there was a farewell banquet and everyone seemed happy.

Lü Bu, fearing that Yuan Shu would turn on him after eliminating Liu Bei obstructed Yuan Shu's attempts to destroy Liu Bei. At this time, Lu Bu's commanders said to him: "Liu Bei has changed his allegiance too often. It is difficult to know what he is going to do and develop relations with him. Soon, you will have to think of a way to take care of him." However, Lu Bu didn't listen to them and even related the matter to Liu Bei. Liu Bei was alarmed and maneuvered to distance himself sending a messenger to Lü Bu with a request to be relocated to Xiaopei. Lü Bu agreed, and Liu Bei was able to safely arrive at Xiaopei where he immediately raised 10 000 troops.

Upon seeing Liu Bei's growing power, Lü Bu became worried that Liu Bei would turn against him so he launched a preemptive attack on Xiaopei. Liu Bei was defeated and fled to the imperial capital, Xuchang, where he took shelter under Cao Cao, the warlord who had been controlling the Han central government since he had brought the figurehead Emperor Xian of Han to Xuchang in 196. Cao Cao welcomed Liu Bei warmly, used Emperor Xian's name to appoint him as the Governor of Yu Province and put him in command of some troops. Liu Bei then returned to the Eastern front to keep an eye on Lü Bu.

During the year 197, Yang Feng and Han Xian were brigands who raided the area between Yang and Xu provinces and were ordered by Lü Bu to lead their troops to raid Liu Bei's supplies. However, Liu Bei successfully lured them into a trap. Yang Feng was killed while Han Xian managed to escape.

In 198, Lü Bu renewed his alliance with Yuan Shu to counter Cao Cao's growing influence. Lu Bu ordered his soldiers to gather gold and money to buy some military hores however along the way Liu Bei led his troops and managed to capture the gold and money. In response, Lu Bu sent Gao Shun and Zhang Liao to attack Liu Bei at Peicheng. Cao Cao sent Xiahou Dun to support Liu Bei but he was unable to rescue Liu Bei and they were defeated by Gao Shun again he had his family captured by Gao Shun who sent them to Lu Bu. Liu Bei fled to Xuchang to take shelter under Cao Cao who brought Liu Bei along as he personally led an army to attack Lü Bu in Xu Province. Later that year, the combined forces of Cao Cao and Liu Bei defeated Lü Bu at the Battle of Xiapi; Lü Bu was captured and executed after his defeat.

Before his execution, Lu Bu tried to convince Cao Cao to let him live. He told him: "Let me serve under you and you would be unopposed in the realm." Cao Cao still had some doubts. Then, Liu Bei said: "Will you have Lu Bu treat you the same way as he treated the General Ding Yuan and the Grand Instructor Dong Zhuo?" At this remark, Cao Cao nodded while Lu Bu was glaring at Liu Bei and told him: "Big Ears (大耳), you are the most untrustworthy of all."

Liu Bei recovered his wife and children and followed Cao Cao back to Xu. Cao Cao sent a memorial to have Liu Bei promoted as General Of The Left. Cao Cao treated him with great sympathy. When they went out, they would ride in the same chariot and when they sat, it was on the same mat. Cao Cao's advisors Cheng Yu and Guo Jia urged Cao Cao to have Liu Bei killed however Cao Cao refused to follow their advice because he feared that in doing so he would lose the respect of the heroes and scholars in the realm.

Role in the Cao–Yuan conflict (199–201) 

By 199, Cao Cao enjoyed a strong political advantage over his rivals because he had Emperor Xian and the Han central government firmly under his control. During this time, Liu Bei participated in a conspiracy with Dong Cheng, Colonel of the Chang River Encampment Zhong Ji (種輯), General Wu Zilan (吳子蘭) and General Wang Zifu (王子服) to assassinate Cao Cao, after Dong Cheng had received a secret edict from within the Emperor Xian's clothing and girdle to kill Cao Cao. Around this time, Cao Cao said brusquely to Liu Bei: "Currently among the heroes of the empire, there is only you and I. The ilk of Benchu are not worth counting.” At this moment, Liu Bei was taking a bite and from the shock dropped his chopstick and spoon. He excused himself on account of a clap of thunder and told to Cao Cao: "When the wise said, “If there is a sudden clap of thunder and a fierce wind, I must change my countenance” it was truly with reason. The awesomeness of a single clap can cause this!"

However, at the same time, Liu Bei was anxious to leave Xuchang and be free of Cao Cao's control. Thus, upon hearing news that Yuan Shu was on his way to join Yuan Shao after his defeat, Liu Bei requested permission from Cao Cao to lead an army to stop Yuan Shu. Cao Cao agreed and sent Liu Bei and Zhu Ling to lead an army to block Yuan Shu, who couldn't pass through them and was forced to retreat back to his base in Shouchun and died there later that year. While Zhu Ling returned to Xu, Liu Bei remained in command of the army and led them to attack and seize control of Xu Province after murdering Che Zhou, the provincial governor appointed by Cao Cao. Liu Bei then moved to Xiaopei while leaving Guan Yu in charge of Xu Province's capital, Xiapi.

According to the Wu Li (吳歷) written by Hu Chong, Cao Cao sent loyal men acting as spy to his commanders during entertainments then on some pretext have them killed. Liu Bei often close his gates and concentrate his time to gardening. While Cao Cao would send someone to keep an eye on him. After the spy left, Liu Bei told Guan Yu and Zhang Fei: "How could I become a gardener? Cao Cao is really suspicious. We cannot stay with him." At night, he opened the rear gate and along with his followers left on light horseback. All the clothing he previously received was sealed and left behind. Then he headed for Xiaopei to rise his army.

Pei Songzhi about this commented: "Cao Cao had Liu Bei lead an army to attack Yuan Shu, Guo Jia along with others were against his decision however he refused to listen to them. The matter should be clear. Liu Bei didn't escape because he was growing vegetables. All of this is absurd!"

However the Chronicles of Huayang also gave a similar account with other informations such as Guo Jia and Cheng Yu warning Cao Cao that Liu Bei left with Cao Cao sending riders to stop him but failing to do so. It also stated that when he learned about Liu Bei doing trivial things, Cao Cao said: "Old Big Ears (大耳) is really obvious to what is happening."

Chang Ba (昌霸) of Donghai used this occasion to rebel. Also, many commanderies and prefectures entered in rebellion and joined Liu Bei against Cao Cao. Soon, their mass totaled more than ten thousands of persons. In the meantime, Yuan Shao had defeated Gongsun Zan and was preparing to attack Cao Cao in the Henan region. Liu Bei then sent his adviser Sun Qian to meet Yuan Shao and request that he launch an immediate attack on Cao Cao but Yuan Shao refused. In 200, Cao Cao discovered Dong Cheng's conspiracy and had all the participants rounded up and executed along with their families. Liu Bei survived the purge because he was not in Xuchang.

Having achieved stability in Xuchang, Cao Cao turned his attention towards preparing for a battle with Yuan Shao. He fortified many key crossing points along the south banks of the Yellow River and set up a main camp at Guandu. At the same time, he sent his subordinates Liu Dai  and Wang Zhong to attack Liu Bei in Xu Province but they were defeated. Cao Cao then made a highly risky move: He predicted that Yuan Shao would not make any advances so he secretly left his defensive position along the Yellow River and personally led an army to Xu Province to attack Liu Bei. Under the weight of Cao Cao's attacks, Liu Bei's forces quickly disintegrated and Xu Province fell to Cao Cao. Zhang Fei protected Liu Bei as he fled from Xiaopei after his defeat; Guan Yu, isolated in Xiapi Commandery, was captured by Cao Cao's forces and decided to surrender and temporarily serve under Cao Cao. Liu Bei headed north to join Yuan Shao.

Liu Bei first went to Qing province which was under Yuan Tan's supervision. Before Liu Bei had formerly recommended Yuan Tan as an "abundant talent' therefore they had good relation, Yuan Tan himself led infantry and cavalry to welcome him. Both of them then left for Pingyuan. Yuan Tan then sent a messenger to report to his father. Yuan Shao then sent a commander to greet Liu Bei and personally went 200 li from Ye to welcome him. Both Yuan Shao and Yuan Tan greatly esteemed Liu Bei. He then stayed a month and a few days; soon his soldiers regrouped under him. He participated in the Battle of Yan Ford alongside Yuan Shao's general Wen Chou against Cao Cao's forces, but they suffered a defeat and Wen Chou was killed in battle.

As Liu Pi, a former Yellow Turban rebel, started a revolt in Runan Commandery (southeastern Henan), Liu Bei convinced Yuan Shao to "lend" him troops to assist Liu Pi. At the same time, Guan Yu rejoined Liu Bei. When Liu Bei arrived, many among the commandery joined and supported him. Along with Liu Pi then led their forces from Runan Commandery to attack Xuchang while Cao Cao was away at Guandu, however as Cao Ren foresaw most of them were newly recruits or Yuan Shao's soldiers not yet ready to follow Liu Bei's orders therefore he quickly assembled cavalry and defeated them. Liu Bei then returned to Yuan Shao and urged him to ally with Liu Biao, the Governor of Jing Province. Yuan Shao then sent him with some troops to Runan Commandery to assist another rebel leader, Gong Du. Liu Bei and Gong Du defeated and killed Cai Yang, one of Cao Cao's officers who led troops to attack them.

Before killing Cai Yong, Liu Bei proclaimed: "I may be lacking in power but even if you were ten thousand still you couldn't defeat me. Only Cao Mengde would force me to flee." Indeed, Liu Bei defeated and killed Cai Yong along with others and fled when he learned that Cao Cao was leading an army.

Taking refuge under Liu Biao (201–208) 

In 201, Cao Cao led his army to attack Liu Bei in Runan Commandery after his victory over Yuan Shao at the Battle of Guandu. Liu Bei sent Mi Zhu and Sun Qian as ambassadors to Liu Biao. Liu Biao himself came to the outskirts to greet Liu Bei and his followers and treated them with utmost courtesy due an honoured guest. He gave him some troops and sent him to station at Xinye County in northern Jing Province to guard against Cao Cao's advances. Soon many men of talents joined Liu Bei and his rank greatly increased. Liu Biao didn't trust him completely and secretly guarded against Liu Bei.

In 202, Liu Biao ordered Liu Bei to fend off Xiahou Dun, Yu Jin and the other officers at Bowang. Liu Bei led his army and set up an ambush. Eventually, he set fire to his own camp and faked a retreat. When Xiahou Dun led his soldiers to the pursuit, they were crushed by the troops lying in ambush at Battle of Bowang. Liu Bei stayed in Jing Province for about seven years. When he was talking with Liu Biao, he rose up to go to the toilet. Then, he noticed that the flesh in his thighs had increased, he sighed heavily and wept. When he returned to his seat, Liu Biao was surprised and asked him about it. Liu Bei replied: "When I was younger, I've never left the saddle. My thighs were thin. Now I do not ride anymore, they have grown. The days and months pass like a stream, and old age will come, but I have achieved nothing. That's why I am sad."

Once, Liu Bei camped at Fancheng with his soldiers. Liu Biao was friendly to him however he was also anxious about Liu Bei's conduct and did not place much trust in him. One day, had asked Liu Bei to join him for a banquet. Kuai Yue and Cai Mao however wanted to use this as an occasion to kill him. Liu Bei saw through this, pretended to go to the toilet and nimbly escaped. His horse was named Dilu (的盧), and he quickly rode him. However, during the pursuit, he fell into the waters of the Tan Stream west of Xiangyang city. Liu Bei was drowning and couldn't get away from the river. He then cried: "Dilu! Today I'm in dire straits! Give it your all!" Dilu then jumped three zhang (7 meters) in a single leap and thus both of them got across. Quickly they found a ferry and crossed the river. While they were at half of the river, the pursuers caught up to them and could only apologize on Liu Biao's behalf.

In 207, Cao Cao planned a campaign to conquer the Wuhuan in the north but was apprehensive that Liu Biao might attack his base, however he was assured by Guo Jia that Liu Biao would not do so for fear of Liu Bei being more powerful than he was. Cao Cao agreed, and Guo Jia's point was proven later, when Liu Biao refused to attack Xu when Liu Bei advised him to do so. When Cao Cao returned from Liucheng. Liu Biao told to Liu Bei: "I didn't adopt your proposal and now I lost this great opportunity." Liu Bei answered: “Now the empire is in chaos and every day there are battles. What seem to be a good opportunity may present himself later. If you are able to respond to them accordingly then this isn't worth regret."

Away from the battlefields in the east and under Liu Biao's efficient rule, Jing Province was prosperous and a popular destination for literati fleeing from the destruction of war. Liu Bei asked Sima Hui, a revered recluse, about scholars. Sima Hui's friend Pan Degong named Zhuge Liang and Pang Tong as exceptional talents who could comprehend important events of their time well. Xu Shu also urged Liu Bei to call on Zhuge Liang. Liu Bei went to see Zhuge Liang and finally had an audience with him after three visits. Zhuge Liang presented Liu Bei with his Longzhong Plan, a general long-term plan outlining the takeover of Jing Province and Yi Province to set up a two-pronged final strike at the imperial capital.

When Liu Bei met Zhuge Liang. With respect, he told him: 

Zhuge Liang answered Liu Bei: 

Liu Bei was greatly pleased and became a closer colleague of Zhuge Liang's each day saying that he felt like a fish that has found water.

Around this time, Zhuge Liang visited Liu Bei. Liu Bei was fond of feathers and when Zhuge Liang joined him, he was tying a recent gift of a bunch of ox-tail hairs. When Zhuge Liang saw this, he said "General, you should wish to realize greater ambitions! Or is tying feathers your only aspiration?" Liu Bei then acknowledged that Zhuge Liang was an extraordinary person and threw away the feathers admitting that it was just "a mere idle fancy!"

According to the Wei Shu (魏書), when Liu Biao saw that his illness was serious, he planned to entrust Liu Bei with the Jing province. Liu Biao told him: "My son lacks talent while all the generals are not up to the task. After my death, I wish for you to be in charge of this province." Liu Bei answered: "Your sons are all wise. I hope your Lordship recover from your ilness." Among Liu Bei's retinue, some advised him to follow Liu Biao's suggestion. However Liu Bei told them: "Liu Biao treats me with generosity. If I followed this proposal, people would believe that I'm just looking after personal gains. I couldn’t bear that."

The Records of Heroes (英雄記) also stated that when Liu Biao was ill, he sent a memorial to have Liu Bei promoted to Governor of Jing province.

Pei Songzhi believed that as Liu Biao and his wife already had decided to remove the eldest son from the succession for a younger one they favoured, there would be no reason for him to provide the Jing province to Liu Bei. Therefore, he said that those were incorrect statements.

Liu Biao died in 208 and his younger son Liu Cong succeeded him and surrendered to Cao Cao without informing Liu Bei. By the time Liu Bei heard news of Liu Cong's surrender, Cao Cao's army had already reached Wan. When he heard of his surrender, he had someone close to him ask about it. Liu Zhong then sent Song Zhong (宋忠) to Liu Bei. When they met, Cao Cao was in Wan and Liu Bei was furious. He said to Song Zhong: "All of you act in such an undesirable way and have not been honest with us from the start. Now only when catastrophe is near do you dare to show your face. Are you thinking of me as a fool?" Liu Bei pulled his sword on Song Zhong and said: "If I were to behead you now, it would quell my rage. However, it would be a shame for a man of my stature to kill someone like you when they are about to fall." Liu Bei sent Song Zhong away and summoned his officers to discuss of the next strategy. Among them, some wanted Liu Bei to persuade Liu Zhong, his officials and the nobles (吏士) of Jing province to flee south to Jiangling. However, Liu Bei replied: "When Liu Biao was near death, he gave me responsibility for his orphaned sons. Now I would have to betray him and his trust to save myself and this isn't something I am ready to do. After death, how could I face him!"

Liu Bei led his troops away and abandoned Fancheng, leading civilians and his followers on an exodus to the south. Around this time, Zhuge Liang advised Liu Bei to launch an attack on Liu Cong, so that Jing province could belong to him. Liu Bei answered that he couldn't bear to do it. Then he passed near Liu Cong's city and wanted to see him. However, Liu Cong was afraid and would not move. Many of Liu Cong's supporters and the people of Jing joined him. Around this time, Liu Bei took his leave at Liu Biao's grave. He wept at the situation facing Jing province.

By the time they reached Dangyang (當陽; south of present-day Duodao District, Jingmen, Hubei), his followers numbered more than 100,000 and they moved only 10 li a day. Liu Bei sent Guan Yu ahead to wait for him in Jiangling, where abundant supplies and an arsenal were stored, with Jing Province's fleet. Among Liu Bei's followers, some said to him: “You should move fast and then hold Jiangling. Although our force is large, few among us have military equipment. If Cao Cao's army comes, how will you stop him?” Liu Bei answered to them: “In coping with a situation one must alway consider men as fundamental. Now that men are joining me, how can I reject them!”

Xi Zuochi commented about this: "Although the Former Lord faced many difficulties, along the way his faith and loyalty became even clearer. As the situation became worrysome and danger even closer, his words didn't stray away from reason. When he remembered how Liu Biao had treated him, his sentiments touched all the soldiers among the army. When he personally cared for those serving righteousness, all were ready to share defeat with him. Looking at the way he could establish strong bonds with others, how could he not act as such! Wouldn't it be appropriate that he managed to bring a great entreprise to its conclusion!"

Afraid that Liu Bei might reach Jiangling County which had military stores before he did, Cao Cao led his cavalry on a pursuit to Xiangyang. When he learned that Liu Bei had already passed through there, he urged his 5000 elite troops to move as quickly as possible. In a day and a night they covered over 300 li and Cao Cao caught up with Liu Bei and captured most of his people and baggage at the Battle of Changban. Leaving his family behind, Liu Bei fled with only scores of followers. He made it to the Han Ford where he met with Guan Yu's fleet, they crossed the Mian River to Jiangxia Commandery and the Yangtze River to Xiakou, where they took shelter with Liu Qi, Liu Biao's elder son and met up with over 10,000 followers. Liu Qi objected to his brother's surrender to Cao Cao and was able to maintain Jiangxia Commandery and Xiakou allowing more of his father's former subordinates to escape from Cao Cao. Following this, Zhuge Liang told Liu Bei that the situation was critical and pressed Liu Bei to grant him authority to start an alliance with Sun Quan.

Alliance with Sun Quan

Battles of Red Cliffs and Jiangling (208–211) 

When Liu Bei was still at Dangyang, Lu Su met him, discussed with him of the situation in the empire and hinted that he should ally with the warlord Sun Quan against Cao Cao. After that, Lu Su asked Liu Bei where he wanted to go next. Liu Bei answered that him and Wu Ju (吳巨) the Administrator of Cangwu Commandery were friends and that he desired to join him. Lu Su told Liu Bei: "Sun Quan is talented and kind. His treats both the elites and the worthies with respect. All the heroes from the south of the Yangtze river already joined him. He also holds the six commanderies, his troops trained and the supplies abundant. You should join him. Now, I propose this plan to you. You should send a confidant of you as an envoy to the east and establish connections, promote the gains of this alliance and together we shall follow the same goal. But you speak of Wu Ju. He has no talents and command a distant commandery. He will soon be under another. How could you entrust yourself to him?" Liu Bei agreed with Lu Su.
 
Zhuge Liang, as Liu Bei's representative, followed Lu Su to meet Sun Quan at Chaisang County (柴桑縣; southwest of present-day Jiujiang, Jiangxi), where they discussed the formation of a Sun–Liu alliance against Cao Cao. Sun Quan already knew of Liu Bei great reputation and was impressed by Zhuge Liang's exceptional eloquence. Therefore, Liu Bei and Sun Quan formed their first alliance against the southward expansion of Cao Cao.

Liu Bei followed Lu Su's plan and led his army to Fankou (樊口). While Zhuge Liang was still on his diplomatic trip to Wu; Cao Cao had already led his vast army from the north and was near. Hearing about this, Liu Bei was afraid. Each day, he sent a scout to learn if Sun Quan's army arrived. One day, the scout reported that Zhou Yu's army was here. Liu Bei asked him if it wasn't Cao Cao's armies from Xu and Qing provinces. However the scout reassured him that he recognized Zhou Yu's boats. Liu Bei had a messenger sent to them. Zhou Yu told the messenger that he couldn't move because of his duty but wished to see and assist Liu Bei. Liu Bei told to Guan Yu and Zhang Fei that after they make contact and established the alliance, It wouldn't be fair to them to refuse their invitation then joined Zhou Yu via a single boat. He told Zhou Yu that they needed a plan to defeat Cao Cao and asked about the number of troops he had. Zhou Yu answered 30 000 which Liu Bei felt was not enough. Zhou Yu insisted that It would be enough for his plan and he only needs to watch him destroy Cao Cao's army. Liu Bei wished to deliberate with the others. Zhou Yu told him that he couldn't leave his post and if he wanted to discuss with Lu Su, he could separately go see him, he also adds that Zhuge Liang would be here in 2 or 3 days. Liu Bei felt disconcerted and although he knew of Zhou Yu's talent didn't believe he would defeat Cao Cao. Therefore, along with 2 000 soldiers, Guan Yu and Zhang Fei refuse to link his own force with Zhou Yu allowing a position where he could either advance or withdraw.

Sun Sheng about this commented: "Liu Bei was a hero. He put himself in a position of certain defeat and reported his predicament to Wu. After he received their help, there was no need for scout and strategy to withdraw. The statements from the Jiang Biao Zhuan (江表傳) are from the documents of the people of Wu therefore offer their one-sided favorable version of those events."

Both sides clashed at the Battle of Red Cliffs, which concluded with a decisive victory for the Sun–Liu side. Liu Bei and the Sun troops advanced by land and water until Cao Cao was pushed to Nan Commandery. Cao Cao retreated north after his defeat and left behind Cao Ren and Xu Huang to guard Jiangling County and Yue Jin to defend Xiangyang.

Following their victory, Zhou Yu divided some area to the south for Liu Bei. Liu Bei established his camp at Youjiangkou (油江口) latter called Gong'an County. Many of Liu Biao's officers and scholars who were previously forced to join the northern armies rebelled and used this opportunity to join Liu Bei. Liu Bei believed that the territory given to him was too small to secure his people and received more commanderies from Sun Quan.

Sun Quan's forces, led by Zhou Yu, attacked Cao Ren after their resounding victory to wrestle for control of Jiangling County. Liu Bei recommended Liu Qi to be the new Inspector of Jing Province and led his men to capture the four commanderies in southern Jing Province – Changsha led by Han Xuan, Lingling led by Liu Du, Guiyang  led by Zhao Fan and Wuling led by Jin Xuan. Lei Xu (雷緒) of Lujiang (廬江) also amassed many followers and led ten thousand of soldiers to Liu Bei.  Liu Bei set up his base at Gong'an County and continued to strengthen his forces.

When Liu Qi died in 209 shortly after Liu Bei secured his position in southern Jing Province. All of Liu Qi's followers wanted for Liu Bei to succeed him as the new Inspector of Jing Province with his administrative seat at Gongan which he accepted. To further strengthen the Sun–Liu alliance, Liu Bei travelled to Sun Quan's territory to marry Sun Quan's younger sister, Lady Sun. After the political marriage, Sun Quan not only recognised the legitimacy of Liu Bei's control over southern Jing Province, but also agreed to "lend" Nan Commandery to him.

Sun Quan sent an envoy to Liu Bei and expressed his desire for both of them to conquer Yi province. The emissary reported to Liu Bei: "The Rice Bandit, Zhang Lu has made his base in Ba and acted as a king. He served as Cao Cao's eyes and ears and wants to conquer Yi province. Liu Zhang is weak and can't defend himself. If Cao Cao gained Yi province the Jing would be in danger! Now, you should first conquer Liu Zhang then Zhang Lu. The tail and the head are connected. Once we united Wu and Chu even if there is ten Cao Cao, there would be no need for worry."

Liu Bei's officers thought Liu Bei should conquer this land alone since Sun Quan couldn't extend his land beyond Jing province. Yin Guan (殷觀) at this time was master of records of Jing province, he said: "If you act as the vanguard for Sun Quan and moved your army but fall to conquer Yi province then while you are away, Sun Quan could use this to his advantage, and everything would be lost! For the time being, you should only encourage his attack on Yi while you explain that you recently conquered several commanderies and cannot act yet. Sun Quan would not dare to pass through us to take Yi alone. With such a strategy of advance and withdrawal, you can reap the both the benefits of Sun Quan and the Yi province.” Liu Bei agreed and followed this plan, he then had Yin Guan promoted to be mounted escort attendant.

And so, Liu Bei answered to Sun Quan: "The people of Yi province are strong and rich moreover the land is hard to conquer. Even if Liu Zhang is weak, he can defend himself. Zhang Lu is crafty and may not be loyal to Cao Cao. Now with the fierce soldiers of Yi and the complicate terrain, the battle is far harder and may be something that Wu Qi couldn't accomplish even less an officer of Sun. Even if Cao Cao wanted to destitute the emperor, he still is officially his protector. And when the civils saw his defeat at Cibhi, they said that his ambition was over, and his power ended. However, he already possesses two thirds of the empire, and he surely wants to take his horse to the farest of the world and led his army to Wu-Gui Commanderies. Why would he allow us to expend ourselves while waiting for his death? Now if we were to attack an ally (Liu Zhang) without reason, Cao Cao would use this opportunity to crush us while we are infighting. This is not a good plan."

Sun Quan didn't listen and sent Sun Yu to lead his troops and camped at Xiakou (夏口). However, Liu Bei blocked this army and would not allow them to pass. He said to Sun Yu: "If you take Yi then I shall let my hair down, go into the mountains and become a hermit so I would not lose the trust of the empire."Also he ordered Guan Yu to encamp at Jiangling, Zhang Fei at Zigui, Zhuge Liang in Nan commandery and Liu Bei himself led his men at Zhanling. When Sun Quan saw this, he grasped Liu Bei's intentions and had to order Sun Yu to return.

Subsequently, former subordinates of Liu Biao who were unwilling to serve Cao Cao came to join Liu Bei. After the death of Zhou Yu in 210 and Liu Bei's growing influence in southern Jing Province, Sun Quan's position in the north became more untenable. Lu Su succeeded Zhou Yu as the frontline commander of Sun Quan's armies and moved the headquarters to Lukou, yielding all commanderies of Jing Province (except Jiangxia Commandery) and access to Yi Province to Liu Bei.

Establishing the Shu kingdom

Conquering Yi Province (211–214) 

In 211, Liu Zhang, the Governor of Yi Province (covering present-day Sichuan and Chongqing), heard that Cao Cao planned to attack the warlord Zhang Lu in Hanzhong Commandery. As Hanzhong Commandery was a strategic location and the northern "gateway" into Yi Province, Liu Zhang was afraid. At this time, the mounted escort Zhang Song told him: "Cao Cao's armies are strong and without a match in the empire. If he was able to use Zhang Lu's grain stores and launch an invasion of Yi province, who could stop him." Liu Zhang answered that he was worried but without a plan. Zhang Song answered: "Liu Bei is of the same clan as you and he is an unstoppable rival of Cao Cao. He commands troops with talent. If we used him to conquer Zhang Lu, Zhang Lu would surely be defeated. With Zhang Lu vanquished, Yi province would be safe and even if Cao Cao were to come, he would be defeated."

After listening to the advice from Zhang Song, Liu Zhang sent Fa Zheng with 4000 men to form an alliance with Liu Bei and presented him with many expensive gifts. Zhang Song and Fa Zheng privately disapproved of Liu Zhang's governance and looked at Liu Bei as a solution for a legitimate successor. When Liu Bei met them, he welcomed them warmly and treated them with kindness. He used this opportunity to learn more about Yi province, mostly the weaponry, stores, and number of horses, as well as other strategic locations and their distances to each other. Zhang Song and his entourage told him about everything and furthermore drew a map of Yi province with the location of the mountains and rivers. With their help, Liu Bei learned all about Yi province. Liu Zhang invited Liu Bei to join him in Yi Province to capture Hanzhong Commandery before Cao Cao did.

Liu Bei led an expedition force of several ten thousand soldiers into Yi Province after leaving behind Zhuge Liang, Guan Yu, Zhang Fei and Zhao Yun to guard Jing Province. Liu Zhang welcomed Liu Bei, when they saw each other, both of them were friendly. Before this Zhang Song told Fa Zheng to report to Liu Bei, that with the counselor Pang Tong backing, they could ambush Liu Zhang at the meeting spot. However, Liu Bei thought that the plan was too hasty for such an important act.

Liu Zhang then sent a proposition to have Liu Bei be made Commander in Chief and colonel director of the retainers. Liu Bei also proposed Liu Zhang to be General Who Subdues The West and Gouvernor of Yi province. Liu Zhang provided him with more troops under his command and have him supervised the White River Army. With those reinforcement, Liu Bei's army was over 30 000 men with plenty of weapons and horses. While Liu Zhang left for Chengdu, Liu Bei headed to Jiameng Pass (southwest of present-day Guangyuan, Sichuan) at the border between Liu Zhang and Zhang Lu's territories. Instead of engaging Zhang Lu, Liu Bei halted his advance and focused on building connections and gaining influence around the area. He was kind and virtuous and so he soon gained the hearts of the masses

Next year, in 212, Cao Cao launched a campaign against Sun Quan, and he soon called Liu Bei for help. Liu Bei sent a messenger to Liu Zhang: "Cao Cao campaigned against Sun and now they are in danger. Both me and them were like "lips and teeth". Moreover, Guan Yu is fighting against Yue Jian at Qingni (清泥). If I don't go to help him now and he is defeated, then he will invade Jing province and the danger will be greater than Zhang Lu. Zhang Lu is looking to preserve his state. He isn't worth to worry about."and he requested that another 10,000 soldiers and additional provisions aid in the defence of Jing Province. Liu Zhang gave him only 4,000 troops and half of the other supplies he requested. Liu Bei used this as a way to motivate his troops: "I'm fighting the enemies of the province. My men are tired and cannot enjoy a peaceful life. While Liu Zhang amasses wealth in his palaces but reward mertis feebly. He hopes for the worthies and the brave to go fight in his place. But how can he think as such?"

Fa Zheng, Zhang Song and Meng Da set into motion their plan but they worried that Liu Bei would leave. They said to him that now that success is near, how could he give up and leave. At this time, Zhang Su (張肅), Zhang Song's brother, discovered his brother's secret communications with Liu Bei and reported the issue to Liu Zhang. Liu Zhang was furious and stunned when he heard that Zhang Song had been helping Liu Bei to take over Yi Province from him – he executed Zhang Song and ordered his officers guarding the passes to Chengdu to keep secret documents and letters to Liu Bei.

When Liu Bei found out about this, he was furious. Fa Zheng and Meng Da defected to Liu Bei's side before Yang Huai and Gao Pei, Liu Zhang's subordinates guarding Boshui Pass, knew about Liu Bei's true motive. Liu Bei lured Yang Huai and Gao Pei into a trap and executed them for behaving disrespectfully towards him. He then took command of Yang Huai's and Gao Pei's troops. Liu Bei then had Huang Zhong and Zhuo Ying lead his soldiers against Liu Zhang. When he enterred the different passes, he took the commanders as hostage along with their family. He then advanced with his troops and turned to attack Fu County (涪縣; present-day Mianyang, Sichuan).

In the spring of 213, Liu Zhang sent Liu Gui, Ling Bao, Zhang Ren, Deng Xian, Wu Yi and other officers to stop him at Fu. However, all were soundly defeated and had to retreat to Mianzhu. They were killed or captured by Liu Bei's forces. Despite being the most trusted vassal of Liu Zhang, Wu Yi soon changed allegiance, Li Yan and Fei Guan were sent to help them at Mianzhu, but they surrendered to Liu Bei as well. Liu Bei's army was getting stronger, and he sent commanders to pacify the other prefectures. Among them were Zhuge Liang, Zhang Fei, Zhao Yun. They led their army and pacified Baidi Jiangzhou and Jiangyang. Only Guan Yu stayed behind to defend Jing province.

Now the remnant force was under command of Liu Zhang's son, Liu Xun, and he retreated to Luo County (northwest of Chengdu, Sichuan). There, Pang Tong was killed by a stray arrow, and the siege became a prolonged one for nearly a year. In 214, Luo County fell to Liu Bei. Previously, when Liu Bei launched his campaign against Liu Zhang; Zhao Jian (趙戩) a Wei official who served as a clerk in the chancellor's office believed Liu Bei would fall mentioning his past failures and Yi's natural defences. However Fu Gan (傅幹) chastised him and said: "Liu Bei is generous and lenient; his men are willing to fight to the death for him. Zhuge Liang is a perceptive administrator able to adapt to changing situations. He is honorable, talented in planning and worked as his chancellor. Zhang Fei and Guan Yu are brave and also possess righteousness. Both of them are known as warriors who are a match for ten thousand men (萬人敵) and are his commanders. These three men are heroes. Knowing of Liu Bei's awareness along with those three heroes assisting him. How he could not succeed?"

Liu Zhang continued to hold up inside Chengdu. Ma Chao, a former warlord and vassal under Zhang Lu, defected to Liu Bei's side and joined him in attacking Chengdu. Although Chengdu's citizens were terrified by Ma Chao's army, they insisted on putting up a desperate fight against the enemy. However, Liu Zhang surrendered to Liu Bei after stating that he did not wish to see further bloodshed. Liu Bei then succeeded Liu Zhang as the Governor of Yi Province and relocated him to Gong'an County in Jing Province. The Yi province was rich and prosper, Liu Bei had a banquet prepared for the officers and soldiers. He used the gold and silver to repay them and distributed ilk and grain to the common people.

Liu Bei married Wu Yi's sister and went on numerous public tours to consolidate his control on the newly conquered Yi Province. He promoted Zhuge Liang to an office that granted him control over all affairs of state and appointed Dong He as Zhuge Liang's deputy. Fa Zheng as his strategist. Guan Yu, Zhang Fei and Ma Chao as his commanders. Xu Jing, Mi Zhu and Jian Yong as his guests. The rest of Liu Bei's followers, new and old, were entrusted with new responsibilities and promoted to new ranks with Liu Zhang's followers promoted into prominent positions so their talents would not be wasted. Among the talented with ambitions, all competed for Liu Bei's attention.

Sun–Liu territorial dispute (215–217) 

After Liu Bei's conquest of Yi Province, Sun Quan sent Lu Su as an emissary to demand the return of the commanderies in Jing Province, but Liu Bei refused and told him to wait until he took Liang province. Sun Quan was furious then sent Lü Meng and Ling Tong to lead 20,000 men to attack southern Jing Province and they succeeded in capturing Changsha, Guiyang and Lingling commanderies. In the meantime, Lu Su and Gan Ning advanced to Yiyang County with 10,000 men to block Guan Yu) and took over command of the army at Lukou. Liu Bei personally went to Gong'an County with 50 000 soldiers while Guan Yu led 30,000 men to Yiyang County. When war was about to break out, Liu Bei received news that Cao Cao was planning to attack Hanzhong Commandery after Zhang Lu fled to Baxi.

Liu Bei became worried about Cao Cao seizing Hanzhong Commandery. and requested for a border treaty with Sun Quan for the Jing province with Jiangxia, Changsha and Guiyang going to Sun Quan while Nan commandery, Lingling and Wuling would go back to Liu Bei, setting the new border along the Xiang River. Liu Bei led his army back to Ba commandery and had Huang Quan sent to lead troops to meet Zhang Lu, however he already had surrendered to Cao Cao.

Hanzhong Campaign (217–219) 

In 215, Cao Cao defeated Zhang Lu at the Battle of Yangping and seized Hanzhong Commandery. Sima Yi and Liu Ye advised him to take advantage of the victory to attack Yi Province, since it was still unstable under Liu Bei's new government and Liu Bei himself was away in Jing Province. Cao Cao, who was not fond of the terrain of the region, refused and left Xiahou Yuan, Zhang He and Xu Huang to defend Hanzhong Commandery.

In anticipation of a prolonged war, Zhang He led his army to Dangqu Commandery (宕渠郡; around present-day Qu County, Sichuan) in order to relocate the population of Ba Commandery (巴郡; present-day Chongqing and eastern Sichuan) to Hanzhong Commandery. Meanwhile, Liu Bei appointed Zhang Fei as the Administrator of Baxi Commandery and ordered him to take over the region. Zhang Fei and Zhang He faced each other for 50 days, which concluded with a victory for the former following a surprise attack on the latter. Narrowly escaping, Zhang He retreated to Nanzheng County on foot, and the Ba region became part of Liu Bei's territory.

In 217, Fa Zheng pointed out the strategic necessities of seizing Hanzhong Commandery and advised Liu Bei to drive Cao Cao's force out of the area. Liu Bei sent Zhang Fei, Ma Chao and others to capture Wudu Commandery, while he assembled an army and advanced to Yangping Pass. Zhang Fei was forced to retreat after his aides Wu Lan and Lei Tong were defeated and killed by Cao Cao's forces. Liu Bei, engaged Xiahou Yuan at Yangping Pass, tried to cut the enemy's supply route by sending his general Chen Shi to Mamingge, but was routed by Xiahou Yuan's subordinate, Xu Huang. Liu Bei then pressed on Zhang He at Guangshi but failed to achieve any success; at the same time, Xiahou Yuan and Zhang He were not able to hinder Liu Bei from mobilising forces around the area. The war turned into a stalemate, and Cao Cao decided to gather an army in Chang'an to fight Liu Bei.

In the spring of 218, Liu Bei and Xiahou Yuan had faced each other for over a year. Liu Bei led the main army to the south of the Mian River and ordered Huang Zhong to set up camps on Mount Dingjun, where Xiahou Yuan's encampment in the valley below could be easily monitored. One night, Liu Bei sent 10,000 troops to attack Zhang He in Guangshi and set fire to Xiahou Yuan's barricades. Xiahou Yuan then led a small detachment to put out the fire and sent the main army to reinforce Zhang He. Fa Zheng saw an opportunity for attack and signalled to Liu Bei to launch an assault. Liu Bei sent Huang Zhong to attack the weakened enemy from above. Huang Zhong targeted Xiahou Yuan's unit and completely routed it. Both Xiahou Yuan and Zhao Yong, Cao Cao's appointed Inspector of Yi Province, were killed in the battle.

Zhang He, who had been informally elected to succeed Xiahou Yuan by Du Xi and Guo Huai, retreated to the northern bank of the Han River, and awaited Cao Cao's reinforcement from Chang'an. Liu Bei knew Cao Cao would come yet he knew he would hold Hanzhong. He secured all strategic points at the exit of the passes linking Chang'an and Hanzhong Commandery while Cao Cao was approaching via Xie Valley. Liu Bei faced Cao Cao for several months but never engaged the latter in battle, effectively forcing Cao to retreat as many of his soldiers started to desert. Zhang He also retreated to Chencang County (陳倉縣; east of present-day Baoji, Shaanxi) to set up defences for a potential invasion by Liu Bei. Liu Bei led his main army to Nanzheng County and sent Meng Da and Liu Feng to capture Fangling and Shangyong commanderies from Shen Dan (申耽).

In 219, after Liu Bei conquered Hanzhong Commandery, his subjects urged him to declare himself a vassal king too to challenge Cao Cao, who was enfeoffed as a vassal king ("King of Wei") by Emperor Xian in 219. Liu Bei thus declared himself "King of Hanzhong" and set up his headquarters in Chengdu, the capital of Yi Province.

He designated his son Liu Shan as his heir apparent. Wei Yan was put in charge of Hanzhong Commandery. Xu Jing and Fa Zheng were respectively appointed as Grand Tutor and Prefect of the Masters of Writing in Liu Bei's vassal kingdom, while Guan Yu, Zhang Fei, Ma Chao and Huang Zhong were respectively appointed Generals of the Vanguard, Right, Left and Rear.

Becoming an emperor (219–221) 

In early winter 219, Sun Quan's forces led by Lü Meng invaded Liu Bei's territories in Jing Province and captured and executed Guan Yu. After learning of Guan Yu's death and the loss of Jing Province, Liu Bei turned furious and ordered his troops to begin preparing for war with Sun Quan. In early 220, Cao Cao died and was succeeded by his son, Cao Pi. Later that year, Cao Pi usurped the throne from Emperor Xian, ended the Eastern Han dynasty and established the state of Cao Wei with himself as the emperor. With some report saying that the Han Emperor had been killed, Liu Bei declared mourning and adopted mourning clothes. He gave the emperor the posthumous title of The Filial Commiserating Emperor (孝愍皇帝).

Following the rumors of Emperor Xian's death, there were many favorable omens and soon more and more officials among Liu Bei's court advocated to have him declared Emperor however Liu Bei refused.

When Meng Da learned that Liu Bei was going to launch a campaign against Sun Quan, he became concerned that he would be punished for not sending reinforcements to Guan Yu earlier, so he defected to Wei. At the same time, Zhao Yun, Qin Mi and others reminded Liu Bei that he should focus his attack on Cao Pi instead of Sun Quan, but Liu Bei rejected their advice. Seeing that Liu Bei did not prepare strong defences against Wei, Meng Da suggested a plan to Cao Pi to attack Fangling, Shangyong and Xicheng commanderies. Liu Bei's adopted son, Liu Feng, fought a desperate battle against the invaders, but he was betrayed by his subordinates and defeated. Upon his return to Chengdu, Liu Bei was furious with Liu Feng's loss and his refusal to send reinforcement to Guan Yu in 219. Upon Zhuge Liang's suggestion, Liu Bei had Liu Feng commit suicide and wept after he died.

In 221, Liu Bei declared himself emperor too and established the state of Shu Han; he claimed that his intention was to keep the Han dynasty's lineage alive. He changed the reign year and made Zhuge Liang his chancellor and Xu Jing his minister over the masses. He established a bureaucracy and an ancestral temple where he offered sacrifices to Emperor Gao (the founding emperor of the Han Dynasty). He designated Lady Wu as his empress and made his son Liu Shan as crown prince. Later, he named his son Liu Yong prince of Lu and his other son Liu Li prince of Liang.

Defeat and death (221–223) 

In the August 221, Liu Bei personally led an army to attack Sun Quan to avenge Guan Yu and retake his lost territories in Jing Province, while leaving Zhuge Liang in charge of state affairs in Chengdu. Sun Quan sent a letter seeking for peace, but Liu Bei refused. Even though Zhang Fei was murdered by his subordinates during the onset of the battle, Liu Bei was still able to achieve initial victories against the Sun commandants stationed at Wu and Zigui until Lu Xun, the frontline commander of Sun Quan's forces, ordered a retreat to Yiling. Lu Xun held his position there and refused to engage the invaders.

Knowing that his enemy was not expecting a sudden strike, Lu Xun ordered a counterattack and set fire to the Shu camps linked to each other by wooden fences. 40 camps of Liu Bei's expedition force were destroyed in the fire attack and the remaining troops were defeated and forced to flee west to Ma'an Hills (northwest of Yiling), where they set up a defence. Lu Xun caught up with and besieged Liu Bei there before his men could recuperate. Liu Bei managed to escape overnight to Baidicheng by ordering his men to discard their armour and set them aflame to form a fire blockade. Lu Xun was unable to overcome the blockade and did not press any further attack. Eventually because of Cao Pi's invasion of Wu, Lu Xun and Liu Bei renewed their alliance.

A few weeks before the decisive engagement between the Shu and Wu forces, there was an impressive yellow aura that manifested into the sky. Many saw this as an omen. After his defeat, Liu Bei lamented about this: "My defeat is Heaven's will!"

Liu Bei stayed in Baidicheng until his death from a serious illness on 1 April 223. Sun Quan heard that Liu Bei was in Baidi and sent an envoy for peace, Liu Bei accepted and had Zhong Wei (宗瑋) sent in response. When Huang Yuan (黃元) administrator of Hanjia heard that Liu Bei was ill, he rebelled because he feared that after his death, his bad relationship with Zhuge Liang would bring him problems. He was defeated by Cheng Hu (陳曶) and executed.

Mostly all of his longterm closest officials were passed on and he was shamed by his defeat. Liu Bei refused to return to his capital in Chengdu, his oncoming death was pronounced. On his deathbed, he named Zhuge Liang and Li Yan as regents to support Liu Shan and encouraged his sons to live well and do right.

Liu Bei's posthumous decree to Liu Shan was as such: When he was near death, he told his son Liu Yong to treat with his brothers the chancellor as a father and do their utmost to help him.

His body was brought back to Chengdu and entombed at Huiling (惠陵; southern suburb of present-day Chengdu) four months later. Liu Bei was given the posthumous name Zhaolie. Liu Shan succeeded him as the emperor of Shu Han, while Zhuge Liang later solidified peace with Sun Quan and rebuilt the old Sun–Liu alliance against Cao Pi formally.

Appraisal

Chen Shou, once a subject of Shu and the historian who wrote Liu Bei's biography in the Records of the Three Kingdoms (Sanguozhi), appraised Liu Bei as follows:

Chang Qu, historian and compiler of the Chronicles of Huayang in the fourth-century later used by Pei Songzhi in his annotations to the historical text Records of the Three Kingdoms (Sanguozhi) also gave his appraisal of Liu Bei:

However, the opinions of modern historians are more negative. As Rafe de Crespigny writes in Fire over Luoyang: A History of the Later Han Dynasty 23–220 AD:

Rafe de Crespigny also gave a more neutral appraisal of Liu Bei in A Biographical Dictionary of Later Han to the Three Kingdoms (23–220 AD):

Family and descendants

Empress Zhaolie, of the Gan clan ( 昭烈皇后甘氏;d.210)
Liu Shan, Emperor Huai (漢懷帝 劉禪; 207–271), first son
Empress Mu, of the Wu clan (穆皇后 吳氏;d.245)
Furen Mi, of the Mi clan (麋夫人 麋氏)
Furen Sun, of the Sun clan (孫夫人 孙氏), daughter of Sun Jian
Unknown:
Liu Yong, Prince of Ganling (甘陵王)
Liu Li, Prince of Anping (安平王)
at least two daughters

In Romance of the Three Kingdoms

Romance of the Three Kingdoms is a 14th-century historical novel which romanticises the historical figures and events before and during the Three Kingdoms period of China. Written by Luo Guanzhong more than 1,000 years after the Three Kingdoms period, the novel incorporates many popular folklore and opera scripts into the character of Liu Bei, portraying him as a benevolent and righteous leader, endowed with charismatic potency (called de 德 in Chinese) who builds his state on the basis of Confucian values. This is in line with the historical background of the times during which the novel was written. Furthermore, the novel emphasises that Liu Bei was related, however distantly, to the imperial family of the Han dynasty, thus favouring another argument for the legitimacy of Liu Bei's reign.

Romance of the Three Kingdoms gives additional features Liu Bei's physical appearance. It mentions that Liu Bei is seven chi and five cun tall, with ears so large that they touch his shoulders and that he can even see them, long arms that extend beyond his knees, a fair and jade like face, and lips so red that it seems as though he is wearing lipstick. He wields a pair of double edged swords called shuang gu jian.

See the following for some fictitious stories in Romance of the Three Kingdoms involving Liu Bei:
 Oath of the Peach Garden
 Battle of Hulao Pass

General worship of Liu Bei
Liu Bei is worshipped as the patron of shoemakers in Chengdu, which is also known as the "City of Shoes" as more than 80 million pairs of shoes totalling five billion yuan in sales are manufactured there annually. It is said that in 1845, during the reign of the Daoguang Emperor in the Qing dynasty, the shoemakers guild in Chengdu, who called themselves "disciples of Liu Bei", sponsored the construction of the Sanyi Temple in Liu Bei's honour. After being relocated many times, the temple can be found in Wuhou District today.

Since the Chinese government loosened its control on religious practices in recent years, the worship of Liu Bei among shoemakers has again gained popularity in Chengdu. In 2005, a large procession was carried out in front of the Sanyi Temple to commemorate Liu Bei – the first such event since the founding of the People's Republic of China in 1949.

A commentary carried by the Yangtse Evening Post criticised such practice as mere commercial gimmickry to exploit the fame of Liu Bei. It argued that although Liu Bei sold straw-woven shoes and mats for a living when he was young, he was hardly the inventor of shoes. According to legend, it was Yu Ze who made the first pairs of shoes with softwood during the time of the Yellow Emperor. However, the criticism did not dampen the enthusiastic shoe industry owners in their decision to erect a statue of Liu Bei in the West China Shoe Center Industrial Zone, which was still under construction in Wuhou District as of August 2005.

In popular culture

Film and television
Notable actors who have portrayed Liu Bei in films and television series include: Sun Yanjun in Romance of the Three Kingdoms (1994); Chang Fu-chien in Guan Gong (1996); Elliot Ngok in Three Kingdoms: Resurrection of the Dragon (2008); You Yong in Red Cliff (2008–09); Yu Hewei in Three Kingdoms (2010); Alex Fong in The Lost Bladesman (2011); Yan Yikuan in God of War, Zhao Yun (2016); Tony Yang in Dynasty Warriors (2019).

Card games
In the collectible card game Magic: The Gathering there is a card named "Liu Bei, Lord of Shu" in the Portal Three Kingdoms set. In the selection of hero cards in the Chinese card game San Guo Sha, there is also a "Liu Bei" card that players can select at the beginning of the game.

Video games

Liu Bei is featured as a playable character in all instalments of Koei's video game series Dynasty Warriors, as well as Warriors Orochi, a crossover between Dynasty Warriors and Samurai Warriors. He also appears in other Koei video game series such as the Romance of the Three Kingdoms series and Kessen II.

Liu Bei is the protagonist in Destiny of an Emperor, a RPG on the Nintendo Entertainment System (NES). Released in the United States by Capcom in 1989, the game also loosely follows the plot of the novel Romance of the Three Kingdoms.

Liu Bei's armour (based on the designs appearing in the Dynasty Warriors series) is available in the MMORPG MapleStory. Also featured are Cao Cao, Guan Yu, Zhuge Liang, Sun Quan, and Diaochan's designs.

Liu Bei is featured in the sequel to Level-5's game and anime Inazuma Eleven GO, Chrono Stone, as well as Cao Cao, Zhuge Liang, Guan Yu and Zhang Fei.

Liu Bei is featured as a "monster" in Puzzle & Dragons as part of the Three Kingdoms God Series, along with the Two Qiaos, Cao Cao, Lü Bu, Guan Yu, and many others.

He is also featured as one of the available warlords that the player can choose from in Creative Assembly's game Total War: Three Kingdoms.

See also

 Lists of people of the Three Kingdoms
 List of Chinese monarchs

Notes

References

Citations from volume 32 of the Sanguozhi

Citations from the Sanguozhi zhu

Citations from elsewhere in the Sanguozhi

Citations from the Huayang Guo Zhi

Other citations

Bibliography
 Chen, Shou (3rd century). Records of the Three Kingdoms (Sanguozhi).
 Chang Qu (4th century). Chronicles of Huayang (Huayang Guo Zhi).
 
 
 Luo, Guanzhong (14th century). Romance of the Three Kingdoms (Sanguo Yanyi).
 Pei, Songzhi (5th century). Annotations to Records of the Three Kingdoms (Sanguozhi zhu).
 Sima, Guang (1084). Zizhi Tongjian.
 

161 births
223 deaths
Gongsun Zan and associates
Liu Biao and associates
Politicians from Baoding
3rd-century Chinese monarchs
Shu Han emperors
Tao Qian and associates
Han dynasty warlords
 
Han dynasty politicians from Hebei
Political office-holders in Jiangsu
Political office-holders in Hubei
Political office-holders in Sichuan
Generals under Cao Cao
Officials under Cao Cao
Generals under Yuan Shao
Officials under Yuan Shao
Han dynasty generals from Hebei
Founding monarchs